Henry – Fisherman: A Story of the Virgin Islands is a 1949 picture book written and illustrated by Marcia Brown. Growing up on St. Thomas Henry wants to be a fisherman. The book was a recipient of a 1950 Caldecott Honor for its illustrations.

References

1949 children's books
American picture books
Caldecott Honor-winning works
Charles Scribner's Sons